Keyworth Rugby Union Football Club is an English rugby union club that plays in the Midlands Division, currently in Midlands 5 East (North).

Recent history 

Keyworth RFC has recently upgraded the facilities on offer to players with the expansion of the club house and the recent installation of playing floodlights on pitch one and training floodlight on pitch two. In addition, in the past few seasons the squad has been exceptionally strengthened with the addition of quality young players, such as Adam Waldron and Nathan Hardy who are often stand out performers on matchdays.

Coaching  
The current Director of Rugby, in charge of the selection and training of all teams is Cavan 'Towerblock' Keiran, a highly talented coaching prospect.

Recent struggling 
In recent years Keyworth have begun to struggle on the pitch, the main reason for this being the loss of their two most influential players, Jamie Birch and Jamie Halpin. Both moved away, firstly to University and then across the globe, leading to limited first XV appearances, though when they did return their form often inspired Keyworth to memorable victories. Keyworth are still attempting to replace these inspirational club icons.

2007-2008 Season

References

External links
Club website

English rugby union teams
Rugby clubs established in 1976
1976 establishments in England
Rugby union in Nottinghamshire